Elections to Adur District Council in West Sussex, England were held on 1 May 2008. Half of the council was up for election and the Conservative Party held overall control of the council.

Four extra seats were up for election due to councillors stepping down. No seats changed parties in the election with the Conservative party remaining the dominant party on the council.

After the election, the composition of the council was:
Conservative 26
Independent 2
Liberal Democrat 1

Results

Ward results

References

2008 Adur election result – BBC News
Ward results
Results and turnouts

2008
2008 English local elections
2000s in West Sussex